The 1993 Canadian budget was a Canadian federal budget for the Government of Canada presented by Minister of Finance Don Mazankowski in the House of Commons of Canada on 26 April 1993. It was the fifth budget after the 1988 Canadian federal election and would be the last before the 1993 Canadian federal election.

Background 
The budget is presented amid poor economic conditions and soaring federal deficit. Two month earlier, Brian Mulroney had announced his intention to resign as soon as a new Progressive Conservative leader is elected.

On 18 June 1992 the Spending Control Act received royal assent. That act provided for a legislated ceiling for federal program spending from 1991–92 to 1995–96. Few programs were excluded from the scope of the Act (notably Unemployment insurance). It is a complement to the Expenditure Control Plan announced in the 1990 budget and extended in 1991.

Taxes 
The budget did not brought sweeping tax changes but introduced some technical changes for corporations :
 The budget allowed for faster depreciation of selected capital property items :
 Creating an election to place eligible property (electronic data processing equipment, photocopiers) in separate CCA classes when the cost was $1,000 or more to allow immediate deduction for the taxpayer upon disposition of the equipment. That disposition is advantageous for equipment that depreciates fast.
 A new CCA class with a rate of 25% was made available to patents and licence-to-use patents acquired after 26 April 1993. This measure allowed for faster amortization of patents in the first few years after the acquisition.
 The budget also announced that the 25% withholding tax on payments for the use of patents would be repealed. That tax was imposed on Canadian corporations' usage of foreign companies' patents.

Expenditures 
The budget planned for $7.5 billion of expenditure cuts over 5 years. Most of the cuts were however announced in the December 1992 Economic Statement ($5.3 billion) and few cuts were contained in the 1993 budget ($1.2 billion):
 The federal government planned to abolish 16,500 more jobs over 5 years (the 1992 Economic Statement already introduced a 2-year wage freeze for all public servants, including the Prime Minister, cabinet ministers, MPs, senators and the federal judiciary) ;
 $300 million were withheld from non-allocated reserves ;
 Defence spending levels would be frozen to their 1994-95 level ;
 The unemployment benefits rate reduction was made permanent: it would remain at 57% even after April 1995 ;
 Funding for social housing was frozen at $2 billion yearly and the CMHC would no longer grant 35-year subsidies ;
 Growth in funding for research and international aid was capped at 1.5% in 1994–95.

Reactions 
The budget was poorly received, and described as "stand pat", "do nothing", "non-budget" and a "lame duck". Claude Picher, from La Presse, pointed out that the 100-pages long budget was one of the shortest budget ever and strongly criticized its lack of substance, overoptimistic economic forecasts and unimaginative measures.

Preceding the budget, Mazankowski had stated that government revenues would decrease compared to 1992 as a result of "slow economic growth, continued high unemployment and low inflation".

The Canadian Bond Rating Service downgraded Canada's federal debt rating from AAA to AA+, and the budgetary deficit for the fiscal year was expected to be $32.6 billion. Mazankowski stated that the rating service had based its decision on "erroneous information".

The value of the Canadian dollar declined with respect to the United States dollar in the foreign exchange market the day after the budget speech, and interest rates "climbed sharply".

Legislative history 
The spending cuts announcements of the December 1992 Economic Statement and the 1993 Budget were included in the Government Expenditure Restraint Act, 1993 No. 2 which received royal assent on 2 April 1993.

Notes

External links
The Budget 1993 at Department of Finance Canada
The Budget in Brief at Department of Finance Canada

References

Laws and official documents
 Budget Plan

 Spending Control Act,  1992, c. 19.

Press articles

Canadian federal budget
Canadian budgets
Canadian federal budget
1993 in Canadian politics